Drummaul is a townland and civil parish in County Antrim, Northern Ireland. It is situated in the historic barony of Toome Upper and contains the town of Randalstown.

The name derives from the Irish: Druim Mail (Mal's ridge).

Drummaul parish
The parish is bounded by the civil parishes of Duneane, Portglenone, Ahoghill and Braid, and to the south by Lough Neagh. It contains the following 51 townlands:

 

A
Aughaboy, Aghaloughan, Andraid, Artresnahan, Aughalish

B
Ballealy South, Ballydunmaul, Ballygrooby, Ballylurgan, Ballymacilroy, Ballynacraigy, Ballynaleney, Ballytresna, Barnish

C
Caddy, Clare, Cloghogue, Clonboy, Clonkeen, Coolsythe, Cormorant Rock, Craigmore, Creagh

D
Downkillybegs, Drumanaway, Drummaul, Drumsough

F
Farlough, Feehogue

G
Gortagharn, Groggan

K
Kilknock, Killyfad

L
Leitrim, Lenagh, Lisnagreggan, Lurgan West

M
Magherabeg, Magheralane, Magheramurphy, Mount Shalgus, Muckleramer

P
Portlee, Procklis

R
Randalstown

S
Shane's Castle Park, Sharvogues, Skady Tower

T
Tamlaght, Tannaghmore, Terrygowan

Drummaul townland

The townland is situated in the historic barony of Toome Upper and the civil parish of Drummaul and covers an area of 339 acres.

The population of the townland decreased during the 19th century:

See also
List of civil parishes of County Antrim
List of townlands in County Antrim

References

 
Townlands of County Antrim